Burton Court (sometimes called Bourton Court ) is a park in Chelsea, London.

It belongs to the Royal Chelsea Hospital which is situated on the southside of Royal Hospital Road, and comprises three tennis courts, a tennis academy and a cricket pitch. Burton Court serves as home ground to the Household Division, thus hosting cricket matches many of which involve Army regiments.

History
In 1687-88 a public footpath was established through the park after the building of the hospital. In 1761 this footpath closed at night, resulting in an extra half a mile for pedestrians to walk around it. Garden Row was built in 1733 facing Burton Court and by 1794 had seven houses.

See also
Royal Chelsea Hospital

References

Buildings and structures in the Royal Borough of Kensington and Chelsea
Parks and open spaces in the Royal Borough of Kensington and Chelsea
Tennis venues in London
Cricket grounds in London
Chelsea, London